The Harris Geodetic LW 108 is an American homebuilt aircraft that was designed by J. Warren Harris of Vernal, Utah and made available in the form of plans for amateur construction.

Design and development
The aircraft features a cantilever low-wing, a two-seats-in-side-by-side configuration enclosed cockpit under a bubble canopy, fixed landing gear and a single engine in tractor configuration.

The aircraft is made from spruce and plywood, with the fuselage a geodetic airframe structure, producing a strong, lightweight and low-drag shape. The standard engine recommended was the  Continental A80.

Operational history
By October 2013 no examples remained registered in the United States with the Federal Aviation Administration and it is possible that none exist any more.

Specifications (Geodetic LW 108)

References

Geodetic LW 108
1960s United States sport aircraft
Single-engined tractor aircraft
Low-wing aircraft
Homebuilt aircraft